Spencer Monroe is a fictional character from the comic book series The Walking Dead and the television series of the same name, where he was portrayed by Austin Nichols. He is the son of the Alexandria Safe Zone leader, Douglas Monroe and his wife, Regina. He is known for being cowardly, jealous and selfish, while trying to build a relationship with Andrea. In the television series, he is the son of Deanna and Reg, and has a brother named Aiden. In the TV series, he falls in love with Rosita Espinosa and starts a relationship with her after she breaks up with Abraham Ford. In the seventh season, Spencer is killed by Negan.

Appearances

Comic book series
Spencer Monroe is the son of Douglas and Regina, who lead Alexandria. At the dinner party hosted for the newcomers, Spencer bonds with Andrea, the group's primary sharpshooter. He insists that she show him a demonstration of her shooting skills. Andrea appears less interested, and is shocked to discover that Spencer is Douglas' son, Douglas having flirted with her on her group's arrival.

Spencer eventually invites Andrea over for dinner, and she tells him that she is not interested in a relationship. When the herd attacks the Safe-Zone and Andrea is trapped in the clock tower, Spencer joins Heath and Glenn Rhee to try and bring her supplies. The four of them are stranded on a rooftop outside of the wall and contemplate how they can help the rest of the Safe-Zone residents. Spencer suggests that he and Andrea leave everyone (including his own father) and go off on their own. Andrea is appalled by his cowardice and responds to his suggestion by punching him and declaring "That's about the end of you and me."

When Andrea tells him that there is nothing between them, he soon becomes the co-conspirator in an attempt on Rick Grimes' life, which is quickly foiled. Spencer grows jealous of Rick and Andrea's relationship, and voices his disagreement with Rick's leadership decisions after he takes over the role from his father.

While Rick is at The Kingdom meeting with King Ezekiel, Negan stops by at the Alexandria Safe Zone. He is told that Rick is busy gathering supplies, so Negan decides to rest at one of the vacant houses. Spencer approaches Negan and tells him that Rick isn't fit to be the leader and that he should be killed. Negan requests that Spencer walk with him so they could talk about Rick. Negan then proceeds to talk about how Rick is out gathering supplies so that he wouldn't hurt anyone while Spencer waited until Rick was gone so he could talk to him and told him to do his dirty work, and that he has no guts. Negan then slices open Spencer's stomach with a knife, leaving his guts hanging out of his open stomach. Despite their problems, Andrea cries over Spencer's death, believing he did not deserve what happened to him.

Television series

Season 5

Spencer is introduced as the eldest son of Deanna (Tovah Feldshuh) and Reg Monroe (Steve Coulter), the leaders of the Alexandria Safe-Zone, and the older brother of Aiden (Daniel Bonjour). In the episode "Forget", Spencer is mentioned by Deanna as the one who had placed the rifle upon the lookout in the clock tower. He is later seen at the party where he meets Sasha (Sonequa Martin-Green) and tries to strike up a conversation with her. However, Sasha turns him down and walks away. He then witnesses her snapping at the others after getting overwhelmed by everyone and the general atmosphere. In the episode "Try", Spencer is seen with Reg and Deanna as they mourn Aiden's death while listening to one of his mix CDs. He is later seen alongside his family, witnessing the fight between Rick Grimes (Andrew Lincoln) and Pete Anderson (Corey Brill) in the town square, and is among all of the residents who hear Rick's rant about Alexandria's mindset being their downfall. In the season finale "Conquer", Spencer is on guard duty when Father Gabriel (Seth Gilliam) approaches the gate in order to take a stroll beyond the walls, but declines Spencer's offer of a gun. When Gabriel returns, Spencer asks him to close the gate as he gets ready for the community forum. At the meeting, he listens to the townspeople and members of Rick's group speak about Rick. When Rick arrives with a dead zombie, Spencer is dispatched by his mother to check the gates after the people are notified that someone [Gabriel] left the gate open.

Season 6

In the season premiere "First Time Again", Spencer listens as Carter (Ethan Embry) plots to overthrow Rick and his group. In the episode "JSS", Spencer is on watch when the Wolves attack, and kills a driver trying to drive a truck through Alexandria's front gates. In the episode "Now", Deanna catches Spencer with stolen food and liquor after he had warned others not to take any extra. In the episode "Heads Up", Rick saves Spencer's life when Spencer unsuccessfully tried to grapple his way out of Alexandria after the Wolves' attack.

In the mid-season premiere "No Way Out", Spencer helps out in the infirmary with Rick's son Carl (Chandler Riggs), who had been shot in the eye. In the episode "The Next World", Spencer kills his mother Deanna, who had been turned into a walker, and buries her. In the episode "Twice as Far", Spencer is seen in bed with Rosita Espinosa (Christian Serratos), and it is implied they are in a relationship. In the season finale "Last Day on Earth", Spencer asks Rick if it is too late to make a deal with the Saviors.

Season 7

In the episode "Service", Spencer goes with Rosita on a supply run after the Saviors arrive to take their tribute. In the episode "Sing Me a Song", Spencer goes on a supply run, and comes back with a large cache of food and supplies that he intends to give to the Saviors. In the episode "Hearts Still Beating", he approaches Negan (Jeffrey Dean Morgan), the Saviors' leader, in an attempt to take leadership of Alexandria away from Rick. His plan backfires, however; Negan calls him a coward for plotting against Rick behind his back, and disembowels him. Rick later finds Spencer, reanimated as a zombie, and kills him.

Development and reception
Spencer Monroe is portrayed by Austin Nichols on The Walking Dead television series initially as a recurring role in the fifth season. For his first appearance in the season five episode "Forget", by Brian Huntington did a panel-to-screen comparison and commented: "Ah Spencer. In the comics, Spencer is the only son of Douglas Monroe. Here in the show he has a brother, Aidan. Now, Aidan is an ass hat in the show. We haven't seen Spencer's levels of douchebaggery, so it's entirely possible the Monroe's only have one intolerable son. But Spencer's intro in the show is pretty similar to his first appearance in the comic as well."

Nichols was promoted to a series regular beginning in the sixth season. Matt Fowler of IGN in his review of the episode "JSS" noted that "Spencer wasn't completely useless as he was the one to take out that 16-wheeler headed for the gate, causing it to crash and sound its horn". In his review of the episode "Now", Brian Moylan of The Guardian commented that "I loved the scene on the wall between Spencer and Rosita when she thanked him for killing the truck driver and let him know that, unlike the other Alexandrians, he was fit to live. He then got to eat his reward, a sleeve of half-stale water crackers." In his review of the episode "Heads Up", Matt Fowler of IGN commented on "Spencer trying to crawl across a rope to get to a car and almost getting himself ripped to shreds. When Rick yelled at him and was all like 'Why the did you do that?' I half expected Spencer to answer 'Because this episode needed someone almost getting killed by walkers!'" Brian Moylan of The Guardian reviewed the same episode, noting that "when stupid Spencer decides to try to make a run for it over the zombies and Tara tries to save him, Rick scolds her, telling her: 'You almost died once for these people.'"

Writing for IGN, Matt Fowler reviewed another episode stating "the only real heaviness to "The Next World" was Spencer dealing with the walker version of his late mother. It was fine, but considering how so much of this episode felt like a fresh start, Spencer's story felt a bit off. Like a hinky holdover from that last big arc. Plus, Spencer still feels off himself. He was one of those characters who kept doing weird, cowardly things last fall when we were all desperately wanting people to step up their game." John Saavedra of Den of Geek! was pleased to see Deanna again, "if only to see Spencer put an end to his mother's suffering. The show really goes for something heartfelt in the Deanna scene, and I appreciate it. That said, I think the scene is more about pushing Spencer's storyline along, which is sort of silly. He's more of that fat the show can go on trimming. But if there was going to be an episode to put this in, it's this one. I'm glad the show distributed this lesser stuff accordingly, which it hasn't always done well."

Kelly Lawler of USA Today reviewed the seventh season episode "Service", calling him "Deanna's brat of a son" and saying of the Saviors coming to Alexandria for tribute, "Spencer may be a jerk, but he's not wrong when he yells at Rick for getting them into this situation." Erik Kain of Forbes also reviewed the episode, saying, "Rosita goes to find a new gun with Spencer who himself has hidden a couple of the documented pistols, because he's rightfully afraid of Rick's terrible leadership. Spencer is another irritating character but he's right on the money when it comes to Rick. Rick is the reason all this trouble came down on them in the first place." Spencer is killed by Negan in the mid-season finale "Hearts Still Beating", and his death was adapted from Issue #111 of the comic book series, for which Kirsten Acuna of Business Insider commented that "If you're a comic reader — and, perhaps, even if you aren't — it was pretty obvious from the moment Spencer approached Negan that things weren't going to go well for him. The end of the episode played out similar to issue #111 when Negan stops by the Alexandria compound when Rick is out on a supply run."

References

Characters created by Robert Kirkman
Comics characters introduced in 2010
Fictional characters from Ohio
Fictional zombies and revenants
The Walking Dead (franchise) characters
Fictional murdered people
Image Comics male characters